The People's Ascent Party (abbreviated HYP) is a Turkish political party founded by the Istanbul MP and theologian Yaşar Nuri Öztürk on 16 February 2005, adopting the principles of a democratic state of law.

In its manifesto, the party claims to be an advocate of social democracy, seeking to benefit Turkey and the Turkish people on the basis of a participatory and pluralistic democratic platform.

On 22 November 2009, Ragıp Önder Günay was elected the new party leader in 4th convention of HYP.

On 26 February 2018, Party dissolved itself and joined the Association for Defence of National Rights Movement Party.

References

2005 establishments in Turkey
Centrist parties in Turkey
Kemalist political parties
Political parties established in 2005
Political parties in Turkey
Social democratic parties in Turkey
Turkish nationalist organizations